Soul of a Woman is the debut studio album by American singer Kelly Price. It was released by Island Records on August 11, 1998 in the United States and debuted at number fifteen on the Billboard 200. The album's most popular single and Price's biggest hit was "Friend of Mine", which tells the story of a woman whose husband cheated on her with her best friend.

Critical reception

AllMusic editor Stephen Thomas Erlewine called Price an "urban crooner, much like a streetwise Mariah Carey or a domesticated Mary J. Blige. She has a sweet, smooth voice that's a joy to listen to, but what makes her debut Soul of a Woman so impressive is that she's not just a singer, she's a talented songwriter as well. Soul of a Woman is filled with well-crafted contemporary R&B songs that are melodic, memorable and perfectly delivered. It's an audacious debut from a promising young talent." Tiarra Mukherjee from Entertainment Weekly found that "one listen to her debut makes clear that Price's poignant vocals rise above her peers'. But without the sugar-pop hooks and samples that dominate the charts, Soul will move only the adult crowd, until the remixers come calling." 

Billboard critic Paul Verna noted that with Soul of a Woman "Price has done an outstanding job on a project that has the potential to be extremely radio-friendly." Connie Johnson, writing for The Los Angeles Times, called the album "stirring debut" and compared Price with "Jennifer Holliday, Shirley Murdock and Martha Wash. All once showed brilliant promise, but none managed to sustain a thriving recording career. Connections with heavy-hitters such as Puff Daddy, R. Kelly and Ronald Isley, all of whom provided production touches to this debut album, may help Price avoid a similar fate."

Chart performance
Soul of a Woman debuted and peaked at number 15 on the US Billboard 200 in the week of August 29, 1998. The album was certified platinum by the Recording Industry Association of America (RIAA) on April 27, 1999. By 2003, it had sold 1.13 million copies.

Track listing

Notes 
 denotes co-producer
 denotes additional producer

Charts

Weekly charts

Year-end charts

Certifications

References

1998 debut albums
Kelly Price albums
Albums produced by R. Kelly
Island Records albums